Charaxes subrubidus, the green demon charaxes, is a butterfly in the family Nymphalidae. It is found in the Republic of the Congo and the Democratic Republic of the Congo (Cataractes, Kinshasa, Kasai, Lualaba, Lomami and Shaba). The habitat consists of woodland savanna.

References

van Someren. V.G.L., 1972 Revisional notes on African Charaxes (Lepidoptera: Nymphalidae). Part VIII. Bulletin of the British Museum (Natural History) (Entomology)215-264. described as subspecies of Charaxes manica

External links
Images of C. subrubidus Royal Museum for Central Africa (Albertine Rift Project)
Charaxes subrubidus images at Consortium for the Barcode of Life
Charaxes subrubidus f. atribasis images at BOLD

Butterflies described in 1972
subrubidus